Featherstone Castle Footbridge is a wooden-decked girder bridge across the River South Tyne at Featherstone Castle in Northumberland.

History
The present wooden structure, which has stone steps at either end, was erected in 1990 and then extensively repaired following flood damage in 1995. Following further severe flooding in the area, it collapsed again but was repaired in autumn 2015.

References

Bridges in Northumberland
Crossings of the River Tyne